Aleksandar Zarić (born 20 March 1989) is a Serbian professional basketball coach and former player who is the sporting director for FMP of the Basketball League of Serbia and the ABA League.

Playing career
Zarić played for the FMP Železnik U18 team that lost from the Žalgiris U18 in the 2007 Junior Euroleague Final.

Zarić played for Radnički FMP, OKK Beograd, Beovuk 72 of the Basketball League of Serbia. During his sting with OKK Beograd, he played 42 games over two seasons averaging 2.4 points per game.

Coaching career
Zarić started his coaching career with FMP as a staff member of head coach Dušan Alimpijević. In July 2017, Alimpijević was named as the head coach of Crvena zvezda, and Zarić moved to Crvena zvezda to be an assistant coach. In 2018, he joined back to the FMP staff. In 2021, FMP promoted him as their new sporting director.

Career achievements 
As assistant coach
 Serbian League champion: 1  (with Crvena zvezda: 2017–18)

References

External links
Player Profile at eurobasket.com
Player Profile at realgm.com

1989 births
Living people
Croatian expatriate basketball people in Serbia
Basketball League of Serbia players
KK Beovuk 72 players
KK Radnički FMP players
KK Crvena zvezda assistant coaches
OKK Beograd players
Serbian basketball executives and administrators
Serbian men's basketball coaches
Serbian men's basketball players
Serbs of Croatia
Shooting guards
Sportspeople from Slavonski Brod
Yugoslav Wars refugees